Kit Carson County Airport  is in Kit Carson County, Colorado, three miles south of Burlington, which owns it. The FAA's National Plan of Integrated Airport Systems for 2009–2013 categorized it as a general aviation facility.

Many U.S. airports use the same three-letter location identifier for the FAA and IATA, but this airport is ITR to the FAA and has no IATA code (Itumbiara in Goiás, Brazil has IATA code ITR).

Facilities
Its one runway, 15/33, is 5,201 by 75 feet (1,585 x 23 m) asphalt.

In 2007, the airport had 7,713 aircraft operations at an average of 21 per day: 95% general aviation and 5% air taxi. 20 aircraft were then based at the airport, all single-engine.

References

External links 
 Kit Carson County Airport (ITR) at Colorado DOT
 Aerial image as of 3 September 1993 from USGS The National Map
 

Airports in Colorado
Buildings and structures in Kit Carson County, Colorado
Transportation in Kit Carson County, Colorado